The 2022 New Mexico State Auditor election took place on November 8, 2022, to elect the next New Mexico State Auditor. Incumbent Democratic Auditor Brian Colón did not seek re-election, and instead opted to unsuccessfully run for Attorney General of New Mexico.

Democratic primary

Candidates

Nominee
Joseph Maestas, chairman of the New Mexico Public Regulation Commission (2021–present) and former mayor of Española (2006–2010)

Eliminated in primary
Zackary Quintero, state ombudsmen and candidate for Albuquerque City Council in 2019

Results

Libertarian primary
Vaillancourt received enough write-in votes to advance to the general election as the Libertarian nominee. However, Vaillancourt withdrew and was replaced on the ballot by Travis Sanchez, the Libertarian nominee for New Mexico Lieutenant Governor.

Candidates

Nominee
Travis Sanchez, territory manager

Withdrawn
Robert Vaillancourt

Results

General election

Results

References

External links
Official campaign websites
Joseph Maestas (D) for State Auditor
Travis Sanchez (L) for State Auditor

State Audtior
New Mexico